Christine Kozlov (1945, New York City – 2005, London) was an American conceptual artist.

Career
She attended the School of Visual Arts in NYC until 1967.

Work
Kozlov was a figure in the New York Conceptual art scene centering around the Lannis Gallery located at 315 E 12th St near 2nd Ave in New York's East Village. She participated in a number of exhibitions in the sixties and early 1970s, subsequently falling away from the art world. Her work has seen a revival since her death in 2005 and been included in a number of exhibitions over the past decade.

Her first pieces responded to questions of sound, memory and information. "Information, No Theory" consisted of a reel-to-reel recorder with an infinite tape loop and a microphone recording ambient noise from the room. It would record and then erase the traces of what was just recorded. It was recently restaged.

She and Joseph Kosuth started the Museum of Normal Art out of the Lannis Gallery. For a short time it featured many of the artists associated with Conceptualism. She was a member of the Art and Language Group from 1971 to 1976.

Exhibitions
Non-Anthropomorphic Art by Four Young Artists 1967
She was the only woman participant in Fifteen People Present Their Favorite Book, a show mounted at Lannis Gallery, New York, in 1967, curated by Joseph Kosuth who assembled fellow artists Robert Morris, Ad Reinhardt, Sol LeWitt, Robert Mangold, Dan Graham, Robert Smithson, Carl Andre, Robert Ryman, among others. 
She was a participant in Lucy Lippard's Numbers" Shows 557,087« and »955,000« and also her Twenty-Six Contemporary Women Artists. She was in Information at the Museum of Modern Art, 1970. The Information exhibition was curated by Kynaston McShine and signaled the birth of Information art and helped to further establish the credibility of conceptual art.
Twenty Six Contemporary Women Artists Lucy Lippard, The Aldrich Museum of Contemporary Art, 1971
Arte de Sistemas, Museo De Arte Moderno / CAYC - Centro de Arte y Comunicación, Buenos Aires, 1971
Reconsidering the Object of Art: 1965-1975, The Museum of Contemporary Art, Los Angeles, 1995
Short Careers, Museum Moderner Kunst Stiftung Ludwig, Vienna, 2004

References

External links
 Alexander Alberro and Blake Stimson, Conceptual Art: A Critical Anthology, MIT Press, 1999, pxl. 
 https://web.archive.org/web/20150514061524/http://www.leftmatrix.com/kozlovlist.html
 Susanne Neuburger  »… with their own intrinsic logic« obituary for Christine Kozlov 
 Peter Eleey "Art on Call: Christine Kozlov, Information: No Theory" 

1945 births
2005 deaths
American conceptual artists
Women conceptual artists
Artists from New York (state)
Neon artists
Postmodernists
Postmodern artists
American installation artists
Mass media theorists
Art & Language